East Barkwith railway station was a railway station that served the village of East Barkwith, Lincolnshire, England between 1874 and 1958, on the  to  line.

History 

The Louth and Lincoln Railway planned and built a branch line from Bardney to Louth in stages, the first stage between Bardney and  opened to goods traffic on 9 November 1874. South Willingham acted as a terminus until South Willingham Tunnel was completed.

It was absorbed by the Great Northern Railway in 1882.

The station was located 137 miles 73 chains from London Kings Cross via ,  and Bardney. The branch was mostly single track and the station had only one platform. A signal box was located at East Barkwith, to control the block, the level crossing over Panton Road and the small goods yard. The yard had a siding serving a cattle dock. There was no loop at East Barkwith to allow trains to pass one another but connections to the sidings allowed the train's engine to run round a few wagons. At the road entrance to the goods yard was a weighbridge and office.

The station building included living accommodation for the Station Master and his family as well as a booking office and waiting room. Architecturally, the building was in the same style as others on the line; built of brick with a number of brick string courses of a contrasting colour. The number and appearance of the string courses differed on each station; at East Barkwith, the general bricks were a lighter colour with darker string course bricks.

The signal box was of timber construction.

Passenger service
When the line opened five passenger trains a day were provided, but this was quickly reduced to 4, with 5 on Fridays. At the start of the Second World War the service was suspended for three months. When it was reinstated in December 1939 the timetable was reduced to three trains in each direction and the 1950 timetable shows that this arrangement continued after the war until closure. In the other direction, trains took 13 minutes to get to Donington and 29 minutes to arrive in Louth (these are sample times and varied during the day and in the direction travelled).

Passenger services ended on 5 November 1951, goods traffic on 1 December 1958.

After Closure
The track was lifted in 1961 and the signal box demolished. The station building became a private residence but has generally retained its original appearance. The platform mostly remains, and a farm track uses the course of the railway to both sides of Panton Road.

Route

References

Disused railway stations in Lincolnshire
Former Great Northern Railway stations
Railway stations in Great Britain opened in 1876
Railway stations in Great Britain closed in 1951